Bayram is the Turkic word for a nationally-celebrated festival or holiday, applicable to both national (i.e. secular) and religious celebrations. In accordance with this dual applicability, the method with which one determines the yearly timing of Bayrams is different for national and religious holidays.

Likely owing to the enduring Ottoman Turkish influence in the Balkans and parts of South-Eastern Europe, many non-Turkish peoples like Bosniaks, Albanian Muslims, Gorani people, Pomaks as well as Muslims from the Northern Caucasus such as Chechens, Avars, Ingush and Muslims from Azerbaijan, Crimea and other Turkic peoples, have similarly adopted the use of the word "Bayram", using the term "Lesser Bairam" to refer to their own  Eid al-Fitr celebrations; "Greater Bairam" refers to Eid al Adha.

State holidays in Turkey have set dates under the nationally-used Gregorian Calendar, while the Islamic religious holidays are coordinated and publicly announced in advance by the Government's Presidency of Religious Affairs department according to the Lunar Calendar, and are subsequently accommodated into the national Gregorian Calendar, which results in the dates for religious holidays changing every year with a shift margin of approximately 11 days.

Large scale non-Turkish or non-Islamic traditions and celebrations may similarly be called Bayram, as illustrated by Halloween being referred to as "Cadılar Bayramı" (i.e. "Bayram of Witches"), Easter as "Paskalya Bayramı" (i.e. "Easter Bayram"), Christmas as "Noel Bayramı" (i.e. "Christmas Bayram"), Passover as "Hamursuz Bayramı"  ("No-dough{meaning 'yeast'} Bayram"), and Hanukkah as "Yeniden Adanma Bayramı" (i.e. "Renewal/Rededication Bayram"). However, not every special occasion or holiday is referred to as a Bayram, as illustrated by the case of World Health Day, or Liberation of Istanbul, among others.

National festivals of Turkey 
 New Years' Day ("Yılbaşı" or "Yılbaşı Bayramı")
 National Sovereignty and Children's Day ("Ulusal Egemenlik ve Çocuk Bayramı"), April 23 (1920)
 Workers' Day ("İşçi Bayramı"), May 1
 Commemoration of Atatürk, Youth and Sports Day ("Atatürk'ü Anma, Gençlik ve Spor Bayramı"), May 19 (1919)
 Victory Day ("Zafer Bayramı"), August 30 (1922)
 Republic Day ("Cumhuriyet Bayramı"), October 29 (1923)
 Cabotage Day is coasting festival for the anniversary of Turkish coasting independence (cabotage rights). Every First July (1926)
 Turkism Day, 3 May (1945)
 Democracy and National Unity Day, 15 July (2016)

Former national festival

 Freedom and Constitution Day ("Hürriyet ve Anayasa Bayramı"), May 27 (1960)
 İyd-i Millî, 23 July (1909)

Religious festivals of Turkey 
 Eid al-Fitr ("Şeker Bayramı", i.e. "Bayram of Sweets", or, "Ramazan Bayramı", i.e. "Ramadan Bayram"), 1st of Shawwal
 Eid al-Adha ("Kurban Bayramı", i.e. "Sacrifice Bayram"), Dhu al-Hijjah 10-13
Passover ("Hamursuz" (mean matzah) bayramı, mostly celebrated by Turkish Jews or Jewish minorities and also locally celebrated by some unreligious groups as folk festival)
Easter  (It's normally called as "paskalya yortusu“ at Turkey's west but some groups in the east call it "Paskalya Bayramı)

Folk festivals
Newroz (“Nevruz Bayramı" or "Ergenekon Bayramı" is celebrate spring equinox mostly count as real new year and justice of the God.)
Hidirellez bayramı is representing the starting of spring and summer days. 
 Kosaqan or Yılgayakh - A spring feast and festival Turkic and Altai folklore.
 Sayaqan or Yhyakh - A summer feast and festival Turkish folklore. So this is a blessing, fertility and abundance ceremony.
 Paktaqan - An autumn feast and festival Turkic and Altai folklore.
 Paynaqan - A winter and pine tree feast and festival like Christmas in Turkic and Altai folklore.
 Nardoqan - Nardoqan or Narduğan was a Sumerian and Turkic-Mongolian holiday, referred to the winter solstice.

See also
 Public holidays in Turkey

References

External links
 Türk Dil Kurumu (TDK, Turkish Language Association): Definition of the word Bayram
(The dictionary data base on the TDK site based on: Divanü Lugati't-Türk ("Compendium of the languages of the Turks") of Mahmud al-Kashgari, 1072–1074)
 List of Religious Days and Holidays, Presidency of Religious Affairs of the Republic of Turkey
  List of Days and Weeks to be celebrated in public school system, Ministry of National Education of the Republic of Turkey

Festivals in Turkey
Turkish words and phrases
Turkic mythology